The Crest was a gothic metal/darkwave band from Oslo, Norway noted for their gothic metal with catchy melodies, massive guitar sound, and a soothing female voice. The band was formed in 1996 by Nell and Kristian Sigland. After going through changes in name and line-up, the band settled on the name "The Crest" in 1999, after recording their second demo when they started to develop their characteristic sound.

In 2001, The Crest recorded their first full album, Letters from Fire, in Sound Suite Studio, together with Terje Refsnes, the producer of Tristania, Carpathian Forest, and The Sins of Thy Beloved.

In 2003 the band took a sabbatical to regain energy for their next album. Nell and Kristian spent time on a side project named "Rustflower Incorporated", experimenting with electronic music. Also in 2006, Nell replaced Liv Kristine as Theatre of Tragedy's vocalist.

The Crest reunited in 2004 and recorded their second album, Vain City Chronicles, at the Top Room Studio in Norway. The album features, according to the band, "a heavier, more guitar-based side of the band, while still focusing on the characteristic melancholic melodies and of course Nell's soothing voice."

In October 2010, Nell and Kristian stated that The Crest has split up to enable other projects.

Band members

Last Known Lineup
 Nell Sigland - vocals, keyboards (also member of Theatre of Tragedy)
 Kristian Sigland - guitars, vocals, keyboards, programming
 Magnus Westgaard - bass, vocals
 Stian Kilde Aarebrot - guitars
 Klaus Blomvik - drums

Former
 David Husvik - drums (1996–2001)
 Xander Sevon - drums (2002–2004)

Discography

Studio albums
 Letters from Fire (2002)
 Vain City Chronicles (2005)

Demos
Most of these demos ended up on the band's first release Letters from Fire.
 "Straightjacket Singalongs" – Demo (1998)
 "Childhood's End"/"Thorn" (1999)
 "Thunderfuel" (1999)
 "Dark Rock Armada" (2000)

References

External links
 

Norwegian gothic metal musical groups
Norwegian dark wave musical groups
Musical groups established in 1996
1996 establishments in Norway
Musical groups disestablished in 2010
2010 disestablishments in Norway
Musical quintets
Musical groups from Oslo
Season of Mist artists